The 2018–19 Memphis Tigers women's basketball team will represent the University of Memphis during the 2018–19 NCAA Division I women's basketball season. The season marks the sixth for the Tigers as members of the American Athletic Conference. The Tigers, led by eleventh year head coach Melissa McFerrin, plays their home games at the Elma Roane Fieldhouse. They finished the season 11–20, 5–11 AAC play to finish in a 4-way tie for ninth place. They defeated Temple in the first round before losing in the quarterfinals of the American Athletic women's tournament to Cincinnati.

Media
All Tigers home games will have a radio broadcast live on WUMR. Video streaming for all home games will be available on the Memphis Tiger Network, ESPN3, or AAC Digital. Road games will typically be streamed on the opponents website, though conference road games could also appear on ESPN3 or AAC Digital.

Roster

Schedule and results

|-
!colspan=12 style=| Exhibition

|-
!colspan=12 style=| Non-conference regular season

|-
!colspan=12 style=| AAC regular season

|-
!colspan=12 style=| AAC Women's Tournament

See also
 2018–19 Memphis Tigers men's basketball team

References

Memphis
Memphis Tigers women's basketball seasons